WWWR may refer to:

 WWWR-LP, a low-power radio station (97.1 FM) licensed to serve Wadsworth, Ohio, United States
 WFJX, a radio station (910 AM) licensed to serve Roanoke, Virginia, United States